This is a list of alumni of Girton College, Cambridge.

References

 Alumni
Girton